JTU may refer to:

Jackson Turbidity Unit
Japan Teachers Union
Journeymen Tailors Union